Jagmohan Singh Kang is an Indian politician and a member of Aam Aadmi Party. He was a member of Punjab Vidhan Sabha from Kharar from 2012 to 2017. From 2002 to 2007 he was the Minister for Animal Husbandry, Dairy Development Tourism & Fisheries in Punjab Government.

Early life

His father's name was Late S. Surinderpal Singh Kang. He was IPS (Retd.) &  Ex-Army Officer. He was from Traditional Congress Jat Sikh family of Village Shahidgarh in Fatehgarh Sahib District and Boor Majra in Ropar District with agriculturist background.

Political career
Jagmohan Singh Kang was the MLA from Kharar. He was associated with Indian National Congress till January, 2022. He was elected as MLA from this vidhan sabha seat in the elections held in 2012. He won by a margin of 6776 votes. Ujagar Singh of SAD was the trailing candidate.
In 2017 he was the candidate from INC and lost to Kanwar Sandhu (AAP) by a margin of 2012 votes. He secured 52159 votes.

Positions Held

1976-80 : Convener, Art and Culture Cell of Pb.Youth 
Congress

1982-1985: Vice-President, Punjab Youth Congress

1982-1992 : Member Executive, Punjab Pradesh Congress (I)

1985- 1987 : Member National Council of Indian Youth Congress (I)

1997-2001 : General Secretary, P.P.C.C.
P.R.O. Mizoram for A.I.C.C. elections 2001.
Member A.I.C.C.

2002-2007 : MLA, Punjab
Animal Husbandry, Fisheries, Dairy Development, Sports, Youth Services and Tourism Minister, Punjab

2010 : Member Election Authority & Addl. PRO Uttar Pradesh Organizational Election

2012-2017 : MLA from Kharar, Punjab

He was elected to the Punjab Legislative Assembly in 1992 from Morinda. He was re-elected from Morinda in 2002 and from Kharar in 2012.  In 2012 he was made a cabinet minister in Punjab and given portfolios of Housing & Urban Development.

Aam Aadmi Party 
On 1 February 2022, he joined Aam Aadmi Party after quitting Indian National Congress. His two sons also joined AAP.

References

Year of birth missing (living people)
Living people
Punjab, India MLAs 2002–2007
Punjab, India MLAs 1992–1997
Aam Aadmi Party politicians from Punjab, India
Former members of Indian National Congress from Punjab